Jarmila Králíčková (born 11 May 1944 in Prague) is a Czech former field hockey player who competed for Czechoslovakia in the 1980 Summer Olympics.

References

External links
 

1944 births
Living people
Sportspeople from Prague
Czech female field hockey players
Olympic field hockey players of Czechoslovakia
Olympic silver medalists for Czechoslovakia
Olympic medalists in field hockey
Field hockey players at the 1980 Summer Olympics
Medalists at the 1980 Summer Olympics